The 1952 Dutch motorcycle Grand Prix was the third race of the 1952 Motorcycle Grand Prix season. It took place on the weekend of 28 June 1952 at the Assen circuit.

500 cc classification

350 cc classification

250 cc classification

125 cc classification

References

Dutch TT
Dutch
Tourist Trophy